The Ganden Sumtsenling Monastery, also known as Sungtseling and Guihuasi (Tibetan: དགའ་ལྡན་སུམ་རྩེན་གླིང་, Wylie: dga' ldan sum rtsen gling, THL: ganden sumtsenling; Chinese: 松赞林寺, pinyin: Sōngzànlín Sì), is a Tibetan Buddhist monastery situated  from the city of Zhongdian at elevation  in Yunnan province, China. Built in 1679, the monastery is the largest Tibetan Buddhist monastery in Yunnan province and is sometimes referred to as the Little Potala Palace. Located in the capital of Dêqên Tibetan Autonomous Prefecture, it is also the most important monastery in southwest China.

It belongs to the Yellow Hat sect of Tibetan Buddhism of the Gelukpa order of the Dalai Lama. The Fifth Dalai Lama's Buddhist visionary zeal established the monastery in Zhongdian, in 1679. Its architecture is a fusion of the Tibetan and Han Chinese. It was extensively damaged in the Cultural Revolution and subsequently rebuilt in 1983; at its peak, the monastery contained accommodation for 2,000 monks; it currently accommodates in its rebuilt structures 700 monks in 200 associated houses.

Because of the popularity of James Hilton's novel Lost Horizon (1933), which introduced Shangri-La and is said have been written on an inspirational theme of "the Tibetan Buddhist Scriptures, where human beings, animals, and nature lived in harmony under the rule of a Tibetan", the Chinese authorities changed the name of Zhongdian County to Shangri-La County in 2001, as the city claims to be the source of inspiration for Hilton's novel.  The earlier names were – the Zhongdian (建塘镇 Jiàntáng Zhèn) to the Chinese, and Gyalthang to the Tibetans, of the town which has predominantly Tibetan population. The name of the county's capital town was similarly changed from Jiantang to Shangri-la. The ambiance of the town is distinctly Tibetan with prayer flags fluttering, mountains known by holy names, lamaseries and rocks inscribed in Tibetan language with Buddhist sutras.

Geography
The monastery, with a group of structures packed together on a rolling farm land, located in the town of Jiantang in the Yunnan province, now renamed as Shangri-la town in the renamed Shangri-la county, is in the heart of the mountain range known as Hengduan Mountain Range; it is part of the Mount Baimang Nature Reserve in Yunnan province but the monastery does not have snow covered backdrop. It is delimited in the north west contiguously by Tibet, to the north by Muli and Ganzi, on the west by the Salween River Lisu Autonomous Prefecture, on its south by the Lijiang; the populace is an amalgam of Tibetans, Hui, Bai, Naxi and Han. The town is located on the famous Southern Silk Road, which originates in Sichuan province in the north, crosses Yunnan province and goes to Vietnam.

Well established road links exist from Shangri-la to Lhasa, Litang, Dali and Tibetan Sichuan. However, there are no rail links at present. The monastery is an hour's walk from the Shangri-la town and is a major attraction for tourists and the change of name of the town to Shangri-la and the impressive Monastery complex are stated to have encouraged tourism to this place.

History
The Sumtseling  monastery belonging to the Gelukpa order of Buddhism was established by the Fifth Dalai Lama in 1679. It was built during the rule of the Qing dynasty Kangxi Emperor (r.1662-1722). He fully patronized the development of this monastery. It is also said that the emperor was associated in the reincarnation search for the Seventh Dalai Lama.

In the 24 April 1936, the monastery had provided full support to the Communist general He Long who passed through this area during his campaign. However, the monastery was partially destroyed in 1959. Since 1981, the situation has changed, the monastery buildings have been mostly restored and normality prevails.

Structures

The Monastery built in the 17th century as the largest Buddhist monastery in Yunnan province, after a revelation by the Fifth Dalai Lama is in accordance with Tibetan traditional architectural style. It has six main structures including eight colleges. The entrance gate is at the foot of the hill and provides access to the main hall of the monastery through 146 steps.

In the main hall of the monastery, more than 1500 monks congregate to recite the Buddhist scriptures. The altar has permanent decorated by yak butter lamps.

The monastery has two major lamasery buildings – Zhacang and Jikang – apart from several smaller lamaseries. Numerous living rooms have also been built for the monks to reside. The main monastery structure built in Tibetan style has a gilded copper roof similar to the one at the Potala Monastery in Lhasa. The other buildings in the complex are built in Han Chinese style.

The road from the old town of the city, leads to the scripture chamber (Gucheng Zangjingtang), which was earlier a Red Army Memorial hall to commemorate the Red Army's long march in the 1930s. At the opposite end of this hall, across the street is the Gulshan Park (Gulshan Gongyuan), which has a monastery with a commanding view of the town and its surroundings. Further along the road, known as the 'Changzeng Lu' ( long north-south trending street with intersecting roads laid in grid pattern) to the extreme south, is another temple. Passing through this street leads to gardens and a pavilion; and further to the north on a hill, there is a Chorten (Tibetan stupa). The east west road 'Tuanje Jie' leads to many smaller temples at the south end around the old town.

Festivals
The Gedong Festival is held in the precincts of the monastery annually on 29 November when devotees from the region attend to worship and also to witness the religious mask dances – the Cham dance – that are performed by the monks in colourful costumes depicting deities, ghosts and animals.

A three-day 'Horse Racing Festival' also known as 'Heavenly Steed Festival' is held at Zandiaong, some time in June (according to the lunar calendar: 5th day of the 5th month), to the south east of the town, which involves dancing, singing and eating, in addition to the racing of horses. Horse traders assemble here in their finest attire of furs and silks.

A new festival introduced in 1990s is called the 'Minority Festival' held in September when artists from  neighbouring districts and Tibet participate to present their art forms.

Gallery

Footnotes

References
Osada et al. (2000). Mapping the Tibetan World. Yukiyasu Osada, Gavin Allwright, and Atsushi Kanamaru. Reprint: 2004. Kotan Publishing, Tokyo. .

External links

Shangri-La County Official Website

Buddhist monasteries in Yunnan
Gelug monasteries and temples
1679 establishments in China
Buildings and structures in Dêqên Tibetan Autonomous Prefecture